
Gmina Jaraczewo is a rural gmina (administrative district) in Jarocin County, Greater Poland Voivodeship, in west-central Poland.

Villages
Gmina Jaraczewo contains the villages and settlements of Bielejewo, Brzostów, Cerekwica, Gola, Góra, Jaraczewo, Łobez, Łobzowiec, Łowęcice, Łukaszewo, Niedźwiady, Nosków, Nowa Cerekwica, Panienka, Parzęczew, Poręba, Rusko, Strzyżewko, Suchorzewko, Wojciechowo and Zalesie.

Neighbouring gminas
Gmina Jaraczewo is bordered by the gminas of Borek Wielkopolski, Dolsk, Jarocin, Koźmin Wielkopolski, Książ Wielkopolski and Nowe Miasto nad Wartą.

References
 Polish official population figures 2006

Jaraczewo
Jarocin County